Szabolcs Huszti (born 18 April 1983) is a Hungarian professional football coach and a former player. He is de facto manager of Fehérvár, even though formally Gábor Toldi holds that position. He was well known for his dribbling, pace, passing and goal scoring ability from midfield.

Huszti began his professional career at the Hungarian club Ferencváros. A short stint with Metz followed, before he was signed by Bundesliga club Hannover 96 for £210,000 in 2006. He scored six goals in his first season, the most memorable coming in a shocking 1–0 victory away at Bayern Munich. In 2009, he moved to Zenit to replace Arsenal-bound Andrey Arshavin. After several spells in Germany and China, Huszti returned to Hungary where he retired as part of Fehérvár in 2020.

He was first called up for the Hungary national team during his time on loan at Sopron, and made his senior international debut in April 2004. Huszti was suspended from the team in 2007 after walking out of a training camp ahead of two UEFA Euro 2008 qualifiers. In 2008, he made his comeback for his country in a 1–1 draw against Slovakia. He retired from international football in 2010, as he wanted to focus on his club career and that he did not like the atmosphere around the national side.

Career

Ferencváros
Huszti (his surname meaning "from Huszt" now in Ukraine) began his professional career at the Hungarian club Ferencváros. Following a solitary first team appearance, he was loaned out to fellow top-flight team FC Sopron in December 2003. During this six-month stint, he scored goals in his 14 appearances. He was called back to his parent club for the 2004–05 season, and began brightly, scoring on his return against Győr and establishing himself as a regular starter.

Huszti's time in his native country wasn't to last beyond that one season. Despite interest from Rangers and West Bromwich Albion, he was eventually sold to FC Metz of France's Ligue 1 in summer 2005. His new club was to endure a difficult season though, as they ended up suffering relegation. This was the catalyst for another move, as he transferred to German Bundesliga club Hannover 96 for just £210,000 in July 2006.

Hannover
He made his Bundesliga debut on 13 August 2006, against then-champions Werder Bremen. His versatility – being adept in both wide positions (despite his preferred left foot), amid the midfield or even as an advanced attacker – saw him become a permanent fixture in the team. He also managed six goals in his first season, the most memorable perhaps coming in a shock 1–0 victory at Bayern Munich. Huszti returned a nemesis for Bayern Munich again when he scored from a wonderfully curved free kick in Hannover's 1–0 win at the start of the 2008–09 season. Hannover had not beaten Bayern at home for 20 years and thus Huszti had ended that drought.

In the 2007–08 season, he established himself as a key player at Hannover, who were having quite a successful season, always being placed in the upper half of the table. Huszti was certainly one of the most prominent midfielders in the German top division, having played all but one match for his team and scoring ten goals.

Zenit St. Petersburg

On 1 February 2009, he moved to FC Zenit St. Petersburg to replace Arsenal-bound Andrei Arshavin. He was also one of the main targets of Glasgow Celtic in the transfer period, but the Scottish club was outbid by Zenit's £2.5million offer. He joined the team on the training camp in Turkey in early February 2009. He scored in his first official game on 18 February 2009 for FC Zenit St. Petersburg a goal against VfB Stuttgart, after 1.53 minutes in the UEFA Cup. He made his league debut two months later against FC Lokomotiv Moscow as a substitute of Viktor Fayzulin.

Hannover
On 23 July 2012, he returned to Hannover 96 signing a three-year contract until June 2015. He gave four assists in his first match against VfL Wolfsburg.

Changchun Yatai
On 16 July 2014, Hannover 96 announced Huszti's transfer to Chinese Super League side Changchun Yatai. On 26 July 2014, he made his debut for the club in a 2-2 home draw against Beijing Guoan. He scored his first goal for the club on 3 August, helping Changchun to a 2-1 win over defending champions Guangzhou Evergrande.

Eintracht Frankfurt
On 30 December 2015, Huszti signed an 18-month contract with Bundesliga club Eintracht Frankfurt.

Return to Changchun Yatai
Huszti received an offer from his former club, the Chinese Changchun Yatai.  German press reported a salary of 3.3 million euros annually. On 12 March 2017, he debuted for the second time for Changchun in 1-0 away defeat to Guangzhou R&F.  On 9 April, he scored his first goal in his second spell for Yatai, a direct free kick in a 1-1 home draw against Liaoning Whowin. In a 3-2 away defeat at Shandong Luneng on 22 July 2017, he accidentally injured his own knees towards the end of the game, which unfortunately ended both his season and his second spell at Yatai early.

Videoton
On 11 January 2018, after twelve and a half years abroad, he returned home and became a Videoton FC player. On 7 April, he scored his first league goal for the club from a free kick at home against Újpest in a 3–0 league victory. In the 2018–19 season, the team reached the group stage of the UEFA Europa League, where they finished third in the group. In his first full season, he won the Magyar Kupa. 

Huzsti retired from professional football in 2020 after a knee surgery.

Club statistics
Statistics correct as of 28 September 2019

Managerial statistics 
As of 28 August 2021

International career
He had also established himself as a regular member of the Hungary national team. He was first chosen during his time in Sopron, by then-manager Lothar Matthäus. His debut came on 25 April 2004 in a friendly with Japan, which he marked with a goal. Huszti scored his two goals for the national team in August 2004, in a Man of the Match display away to Scotland.

However, his international career suffered a setback when current manager Péter Várhidi suspended him from the national team until the end of the year in June 2007. Hungary took this disciplinary action after Huszti walked out of their training camp ahead of two European Championship qualifying games. The player claimed this was because he was unsure whether he would be named as a starter.

In 2008, Huszti made a comeback for his country on 6 February, in a 1–1 draw against Slovakia.

On 9 September 2010, Huszti announced his retirement from the national team. He published an open letter following the Euro 2012 qualification match against Moldova in which he cited various reasons for his decision, including that he wants to focus on his club career and that he does not like the current atmosphere around the national team. Following the announcement, former Hungarian international and Hertha BSC midfielder, Pál Dárdai suggested discussing the controversies between Huszti and Hungarian national football team manager Sándor Egervári claiming that Huszti is now one of the best Hungarian players and could be very useful for the 2014 FIFA World Cup qualifications. Years later, when the Hungarian nationals qualified to UEFA Euro 2016, Huszti reiterated his opinion that he has no intention to returning to the team.

International statistics
As of 3 September 2010

International goals
Scores and results list Hungary's goal tally first.

Honours

Club
Ferencváros
 Hungarian League: Runner-up 2002–03,2004–05
 Hungarian Cup: Runner-up 2004–05

Zenit
 Russian Premier League: 2010, 2011–12
 Russian Cup: 2009–10
 Russian Super Cup: 2011

Videoton
 Nemzeti Bajnokság I: 2017-18
 Hungarian Cup: 2018-19

Individual
 Young Hungarian Player of the Year: 2004
 Hungarian Football Federation nominated him to be the best domestic footballer of the year: 2006, 2013

Managerial career
On 16 February 2021, he was appointed as the manager of Debreceni VSC along with Gábor Toldi.

In February 2021, he debuted in the 2020-21 Nemzeti Bajnokság II managing Debreceni VSC against Szeged-Csanád Grosics Akadémia at the Szent Gellért Fórum. The final result was a convincing 5–0 victory for Debrecen.

On 17 October 2022, he was appointed as the coach of Fehérvár. On 6 December 2022, the club announced that Huszti and his assistant Gábor Toldi will switch positions, with Toldi technically becoming a head coach, but the final decisions will be still made by Huszti. On 14 March 2023, he was removed from his position due to negative performance of the team.

References

External links
 
 
 
 Huszti Szabolcs football profile

1983 births
Living people
Sportspeople from Miskolc
Hungarian footballers
Hungary international footballers
Ferencvárosi TC footballers
FC Sopron players
FC Metz players
Hannover 96 players
FC Zenit Saint Petersburg players
Changchun Yatai F.C. players
Eintracht Frankfurt players
Fehérvár FC players
Nemzeti Bajnokság I players
Ligue 1 players
Bundesliga players
Chinese Super League players
Russian Premier League players
Hungarian expatriate footballers
Expatriate footballers in France
Hungarian expatriate sportspeople in France
Expatriate footballers in Germany
Hungarian expatriate sportspeople in Germany
Expatriate footballers in Russia
Hungarian expatriate sportspeople in Russia
Expatriate footballers in China
Hungarian expatriate sportspeople in China
Association football midfielders
Hungarian football managers
Debreceni VSC managers
Fehérvár FC managers
Nemzeti Bajnokság I managers